The Mayor of Nagpur is the first citizen of the Indian city of Nagpur. The mayor is the chief of the Nagpur Municipal Corporation. The mayor's role is largely ceremonial as the real powers are vested in the Municipal Commissioner.
 
The mayor is elected from within the ranks of the council in a quinquennial election. The elections are conducted in all regions in the city to elect corporators. The Mayor is generally the leader of a party (or coalition of parties) that has a majority. Currently, the post of mayor is vacant due to delay in election.

List

References

Mayors of places in Maharashtra